Established in 1966, the Population Research Laboratory is a centre for social science research at the University of Alberta in Edmonton.

With close to 120 employees, the PRL is the largest academic centre of its kind in Western Canada. It has extensive experience in conducting research in the areas of health, education, labour markets, environment, science and technology, immigration, social policy and public opinion. The PRL utilizes a variety of research methods, including telephone (CATI) and web surveying, census and population projections, focus groups, interviewing, consensus conferencing, and general project management.

See also 

 Faculties and departments of the University of Alberta
 List of presidents of the University of Alberta
 List of chancellors of the University of Alberta
 List of agricultural universities and colleges

University of Alberta
Population